Lucía Ramírez Ramos (born 2 December 1998) is a Spanish footballer who plays as a defender for Alhama CF in the Primera División.

Club career
Ramírez started her career at Sevilla B.

References

External links
Profile at La Liga

1998 births
Living people
Women's association football defenders
Spanish women's footballers
People from Campiña de Morón y Marchena
Sportspeople from the Province of Seville
Footballers from Andalusia
Sevilla FC (women) players
Primera División (women) players
Alhama CF players